Seven ships of the French Navy have borne the name Sans Pareil (Translated as "Peerless" or "Unequalled"):
 , a 62-gun ship of the line, wrecked in 1679.
 , a 50-gun ship of the line, removed from lists in 1698.
 , a 42-gun ship.
 , was the British privateer cutter Non Such, of 18 guns and 77 men, that  captured in November 1779. The French Navy bought her for lt26,949, rearmed her at Brest, and took her into was service as Sans Pareil. At the time of her capture she was armed with 16 guns and had a crew of 100 men. Her owner was described as the "King of France". The Royal Navy did not take her into service but instead consigned her to Robinson & Co., at Jamaica.
 , an 80-gun , captured in 1794 during the battle of the Glorious First of June and taken into service as HMS Sans Pareil. She was hulked in 1810 and broken up in 1842. 
 , a 116-gun ship better known as Roi de Rome, was ordered as Sans Pareil. She was never launched and was broken up on keel. 
 , an airplane tender.

The female flexion Sans Pareille was also used for smaller ships:
  was a privateer that the French navy purchased on the stocks and took into service as a 20-gun corvette.  captured her on 20 January 1801 and the Royal Navy took her into service as HMS Delight, but sold her in April 1805. 
 , a 20-gun ship, captured in 1801.

See also

Notes

Citations

References
 
 
 
 

French Navy ship names